Paul Faucher (6 February 1920 – 15 April 2007) was a French athlete. He competed in the men's long jump at the 1952 Summer Olympics.

References

External links
 

1920 births
2007 deaths
Athletes (track and field) at the 1952 Summer Olympics
French male long jumpers
Olympic athletes of France
Place of birth missing